Jesús Galván Carrillo (born 4 October 1974) is a Spanish retired footballer who played mainly as a right back, and a current coach.

Football career
Born in Seville, Andalusia, Galván made his professional – and La Liga – debut for local Sevilla FC on 31 March 1996, in a game against Real Zaragoza. He appeared in 23 first-team matches during the 1996–97 season, but the club was relegated.

After a quick spell with neighbours Córdoba CF in the third division, Galván moved up to the second level but stayed in his native region, signing with Recreativo de Huelva. He would experience his most steady period, however, at Villarreal CF which he represented four years, scoring a career-best four goals in his first as the Valencian Community side returned to the top flight after only one year of absence.

Released by Villarreal in the 2003 summer, Galván returned to division two with Deportivo Alavés. After a further two campaigns in that tier with a familiar club, Recreativo, he closed out his career at nearly 34 in the lower leagues, with UE Lleida.

Honours
Recreativo
Segunda División: 2005–06

External links

1974 births
Living people
Footballers from Seville
Spanish footballers
Association football defenders
La Liga players
Segunda División players
Segunda División B players
Sevilla Atlético players
Sevilla FC players
Córdoba CF players
Recreativo de Huelva players
Villarreal CF players
Deportivo Alavés players
UE Lleida players
Spanish football managers